Michael Gunnar Nylander (born 3 October 1972) is a Swedish former professional ice hockey centre and current assistant coach with the Mississauga Steelheads in the Ontario Hockey League. He competed for the Swedish national team in the 1998 Winter Olympics and the 2002 Winter Olympics.

Playing career 
Nylander was drafted by the Hartford Whalers in the third round (59th overall) in the 1991 NHL Entry Draft. In the NHL, he has played for the Hartford Whalers (1992–1994), Calgary Flames (1994–98), Tampa Bay Lightning (1999), Chicago Blackhawks (1999–2002), Washington Capitals (2002–03), and Boston Bruins (2004), New York Rangers (2005–07), and Washington Capitals (2007–09).

Nylander scored his first career NHL goal on 27 November 1992 in his 16th game at the famed Boston Garden in a 5-4 Whalers loss. Rejean Lemelin was the Bruins goaltender. The following season, although he was third in scoring for the Whalers at that time, he was sent down to their AHL affiliate Springfield Indians due to repeated defensive lapses. He was recalled after four games in Springfield, but that stint makes Nylander one of the two final players who ever played for the storied Indians to be active in professional hockey.

Nylander was signed by the New York Rangers for the 2005–06 season and played well with All-Star right-winger Jaromír Jágr. He centred the first line and first power play unit. Statistically, Nylander had his best season as he helped the Rangers reach 100 points for the first time since 1994.

Following their 4–3 overtime victory over the Boston Bruins on 8 April 2006, Nylander was interviewed by NBC's Pierre McGuire. He slipped the word "shit" on live television, when speaking about his relationship with Pierre McGuire back in Hartford. Bill Clement mentioned there was no 5-second delay, however Clement and the rest of the NBC crew did issue an immediate apology. Nylander scored the game-winning goal in overtime. The National Hockey League and the Federal Communications Commission never made a decision on this situation.

Prior to the 2007–08, as reported on the Edmonton Oilers website, Nylander's agent had agreed to a contract with the Oilers. While expecting to receive a signed contract, the Oilers instead found out that he had signed with the Washington Capitals.

Nylander tore his rotator cuff during a faceoff against the Florida Panthers on 1 December 2007 and missed the next four games before returning to play the next thirteen games. Eventually, Nylander was forced to have surgery to repair the tear on 16 January 2008, and missed the rest of the 2007–08 regular season and playoffs.

In the 2008–09 season, still feeling the effects of his torn rotator cuff, Nylander managed to collect only 33 points in 72 games. Many fans and hockey pundits criticized Nylander's performance and felt he didn't live up to his contract.

The following season the Washington Capitals faced salary cap restraints. Looking for move salary, they attempted to trade Michael Nylander, but found no suitors for his near $5,000,000 salary. The Washington Capitals first loaned Nylander to the Detroit Red Wings organization (who then assigned him to the Grand Rapids Griffins of the American Hockey League) and then later loaned Nylander to Jokerit of SM-liiga where he finished the 2009-10 hockey season. For the 2010–11 season, Nylander played in the Florida Panthers organization's AHL affiliate in Rochester as they filled a hole at center. His NHL rights remained owned by the Capitals through the end of the season.

On 23 October 2010, Nylander was seriously injured when he was hit from behind by Brendan Smith during the second period of a game between Rochester and the Grand Rapids Griffins. He underwent successful spinal fusion surgery on 26 October 2010 at Strong Memorial Hospital in Rochester, NY and doctors have said that he should be cleared to play again after six months of recovery.

On 17 August 2011, Nylander signed a tryout contract with the Philadelphia Flyers, joining the team's training camp. He was released on 25 September 2011.

Nylander then went on to play for the ZSC Lions in the National League A where he was under contract from October 2011 to December 2011. His contract was not renewed and in January 2012 he signed with the Kloten Flyers. He officially retired from professional hockey in 2015 and is currently an assistant coach with the Mississauga Steelheads of the Ontario Hockey League.

International play

Nylander has represented Sweden a record 13 times, including the World Cup and the Winter Olympics. Having played for the national squad for nearly twenty years since the 1991 World Juniors until the 2010 World Championship, winning nine medals in the process.

Personal life
Nylander is married to wife Camilla (née Altelius). He has six children: Michelle (born 1994), William (born 1996), Alexander (born 1998), Jacqueline (born 2000), Stephanie (born 2003), and Daniella (born 2006). William was drafted in 2014 by the Toronto Maple Leafs as the 8th overall pick, while Alexander was also drafted 8th overall by the Buffalo Sabres in the 2016 NHL Entry Draft. Alexander plays for the Pittsburgh Penguins organization. Daughter Jacqueline is an aspiring professional tennis player, competing in the WTA circuit as well as collegiately at Southern Methodist University.

Michael has two brothers, Peter and Thommy.

Transactions
10 March 1994 – Traded by the Hartford Whalers along with James Patrick and Zarley Zalapski to the Calgary Flames in exchange for Gary Suter, Paul Ranheim and Ted Drury.
19 January 1999 – Traded by the Calgary Flames to the Tampa Bay Lightning in exchange for Andrei Nazarov.
12 November 1999 – Traded by the Tampa Bay Lightning to the Chicago Blackhawks in exchange for Bryan Muir and Reid Simpson.
1 November 2002 – Traded by the Chicago Blackhawks, along with Chicago's 2003 3rd-round draft pick and future considerations, to the Washington Capitals in exchange for Chris Simon and Andrei Nikolishin.
4 March 2004 – Traded by the Washington Capitals to the Boston Bruins in exchange for Boston's 2005 4th-round compensatory draft pick and Boston's 2006 2nd-round draft pick.
10 August 2004 – Signed as a free agent with the New York Rangers.
2 July 2007 – Signed as a free agent with the Washington Capitals.
21 October 2009 – Agrees to a two-week conditioning reassignment with the Grand Rapids Griffins of the American Hockey League
7 November 2009 – Placed on Waivers by the Washington Capitals.
13 December 2009 – Assigned to the Grand Rapids Griffins (AHL). The Washington Capitals will continue to pay his salary, but his $4.875 million salary will not count towards the Capitals' salary cap.
28 January 2010 – Reassigned from Grand Rapids (AHL) to Jokerit (SM-liiga).
29 September 2010 – Loaned to the Rochester Americans of the American Hockey League.
August 2011 – Signed professional tryout contract with the Philadelphia Flyers of the National Hockey League.

Career statistics

Regular season and playoffs

International

Awards
 Silver medal World Junior Championship in 1992.
 World Junior Championship's Best Forward in 1992.
 Named to the World Junior Championship All-Star Team in 1992.
 Elitserien Rookie of the Year in 1992.
 Gold medal World Championship in 1992 and 2006.
 Silver medal World Championship in 1993 and 1997.
 Named to the World Championship All-Star Team in 1997.
 World Championship's Best Forward in 1997.
 Bronze medal World Championship in 1999, 2002 and 2010.

Records
 1993 World Championship record of most assists

References

External links

Nylander a Swede Sensation in NY (nhlpa.com)

1972 births
Living people
AIK IF players
Ak Bars Kazan players
Bolzano HC players
Boston Bruins players
Calgary Flames players
Chicago Blackhawks players
Swedish expatriate ice hockey players in Canada
Swedish expatriate ice hockey players in Finland
Swedish expatriate ice hockey players in the United States
Expatriate ice hockey players in Russia
Expatriate ice hockey players in Switzerland
Grand Rapids Griffins players
Hartford Whalers draft picks
Hartford Whalers players
HC Lugano players
HC Vita Hästen players
Huddinge IK players
Jokerit players
JYP Jyväskylä players
EHC Kloten players
New York Rangers players
Olympic ice hockey players of Sweden
Ice hockey players at the 1998 Winter Olympics
Ice hockey players at the 2002 Winter Olympics
Oulun Kärpät players
Rochester Americans players
Rögle BK players
SKA Saint Petersburg players
Södertälje SK players
Ice hockey people from Stockholm
Springfield Indians players
Swedish expatriate sportspeople in Russia
Swedish expatriate sportspeople in Switzerland
Swedish ice hockey centres
Tampa Bay Lightning players
Washington Capitals players
ZSC Lions players
Ontario Hockey League coaches
Swedish expatriate sportspeople in Italy
Expatriate ice hockey players in Italy